Maha Tharay Sithu is one of the five honors of the Order of the Union of Burma and is a third class honor. On 4 January1948, after the establishment of a sovereign and independent Union of Burma, the President of the Union Government has introduced a new system of annual awards in commemoration of Independence Day.

Maha Thray Sithu to  Chao Pha, Ministers , Ministers of the Supreme Court and Outstanding State Officials were awarded.

Recipients

U Thant, Former Secretary-General of the United Nations
Myoma U Ba Lwin (1951)
Pe Khin, a Burmese diplomat.
U Kya Pu, Panglong Agreement Public Representative
Secretary-General Khin Maung Phyu (1949)
Dr. Ba Han
Min Nyo (1958)
Brigadier General Aung Gyi
Brigadier General Maung Maung Kyaw Win
Chatichai Choonhavan, Thai prime minister
U Sein, Chief Minister of Kayah State from 1948 to 1960
Lieutenant General Tin Oo
Min Aung Hlaing

References 

Arts in Myanmar
Contemporary art
Orders, decorations, and medals of Myanmar